The name Anne has been used for one tropical cyclone in the South Pacific Ocean for one extratropical European windstorm.

In the South Pacific:
 Cyclone Anne (1988) – a Category 4 severe tropical cyclone (Australian intensity scale) that caused extensive damage in Vanuatu, the Solomon Islands and New Caledonia.

In Europe:
 Cyclone Anne (2014) – impacted Western Europe.

See also 
 List of storms named Ann

South Pacific cyclone set index articles